Bokang Phelane is a Lesotho-born South African actress, producer and scriptwriter.

Life and education
Phelane was born in Maseru, Lesotho. She attended high school in the city of her birth, and later proceeded to Monash University South Africa where she obtained a Bachelor of Arts degree in Psychology.

Career
In 2016, Phelane was featured in the comedy TV series, Single Guys, playing the role, "Fezeka". She was also featured in the TV series, Shuga, released in 2018, where she played the role of Andile's wife "Fezeka".

In July 2017, she played the role of Pula in the Season 1 of the South African telenovela, Keeping Scores, shown on SABC2. She played the role of "Lily" in the Zulu language Sci-Fi TV mini-series, Emoyeni (Netflix), released July 22, 2018.
 She featured in the Sotho language shows, Isipho Sothando, shown in March 2020 
and also in Ho Kena Ho Eona, shown in April 2020 both on DSTV.  She is the lead in the African mythology epic TV series, Blood Psalms, to be released by the co-producers Showmax and Canal+ International in 2021, she plays the role of "Zazi", a fierce teenage princess.

Filmography

References

External links
 Bokang Phelane on IMDb
 Bokang Phelane on TVSA

Lesotho people
21st-century South African actresses
South African women film producers
South African screenwriters
Year of birth missing (living people)
Living people
People from Maseru